Library & Archives NT comprises the Northern Territory Library and the two Northern Territory Archives Centres in Darwin and Alice Springs. Located in Parliament House in Darwin City, it is the premier public research and archival organisation focused on the history, development and culture of the Northern Territory of Australia.  The library holds more than 108,000 books and 30,000 items. The archive holds Northern Territory Government records, which are normally opened 30 years after they were created.

The institution resulted from a 2020 merger of the Northern Territory Library and the Northern Territory Archives Service. It is within the Department of Families, Housing and Communities.

Library & Archives NT provides its services to the public through the Northern Territory Library at Parliament House; the Northern Territory Archives Centre in Kelsey Crescent, Millner; at the Alice Springs Reading Room in Hartley Street; and through a range of online channels.

Services
Library & Archives NT holds the largest collection of books, journals, newspapers and audio-visual materials relating to the Northern Territory.  The institution provides support to 32 public libraries across the Northern Territory, including many in remote communities, since public libraries "develop community literacy and learning, provide access to the Internet and other technology, build digital skills and act as safe and trusted community spaces". It also holds regular events and exhibitions.

As a member library of National and State Libraries Australia, the organisation collaborated on the creation of the National edeposit system, which enables Australian publishers to upload electronic publications as per legal deposit requirements, and makes eligible publications publicly accessible online.

Digital archive
 
Library & Archives NT has a comprehensive digital archive of historical and culturally significant materials in the Northern Territory. The collection, titled Territory Stories, includes documents, photographs, and audio and video files to which the public contribute, especially through local knowledge centres managed by the community, including Indigenous communities.

Eric Johnston Lecture

Library & Archives NT hosts the Eric Johnston Lectures, which provide a view of the Northern Territory's past, present and future through the eyes of people who have committed their lives and careers to its betterment. The lectures were named in honour of Commodore Eric Johnston  (1933–1997), long-serving NT Administrator who as a Royal Australian Navy officer played a crucial role during and after Cyclone Tracy. Other prominent Territorians to deliver the lecture following his inaugural address included Thomas Mayor (2020), Banduk Marika  (2010), Tom Calma (2008), Mandawuy Yunupingu (1996), and Ted Egan (1998).

Notes

References

External links

 
Territory Stories Database

Buildings and structures in Darwin, Northern Territory
Tourist attractions in Darwin, Northern Territory
State libraries of Australia
Libraries in the Northern Territory
Education in Darwin, Northern Territory
Libraries established in 1980
1980 establishments in Australia